Zsolt Balog (born 10 November 1978 in Békés) is a Hungarian football (defender) player who currently plays for Békéscsaba 1912 Előre SE.

External links
Player profile at Nemzeti Sport 
Player profile at HLSZ 

1978 births
Living people
People from Békés
Hungarian footballers
Association football defenders
Békéscsaba 1912 Előre footballers
Budapest Honvéd FC players
Debreceni VSC players
Vasas SC players
Egri FC players
Nemzeti Bajnokság I players
Sportspeople from Békés County